Pahaliah is the guardian angel of redemption (name meaning God Redeemer) and is invoked to give us revelations of truth and wisdom.  He is a member of the Order of Thrones and an angel of Virtuosity. He rules theology and morals, granting wisdom, determination and knowledge, and is one of the angels bearing the mystical name of God, Shemhamphorae (Heb. שם המפורש Shem ha-mephorash — "the Ineffable Name", i.e. the Tetragrammaton).

See also
 List of angels in theology

References

Angels in Christianity
Individual angels